Daniil Ostapenkov (born May 8, 2003) is a Belarusian professional tennis player. He was ranked as high as No. 48 in the ITF junior rankings.

Ostapenkov is best known for his shocking upset win, in straight sets, over world No. 15 and former world No. 8 Diego Schwartzman during a Davis Cup match against Argentina. At the time, Ostapenkov did not have an ATP ranking.

ATP Challenger and ITF World Tennis Tour finals

Doubles: 3 (2–1)
{|
|

References

External links

2003 births
Living people
Belarusian male tennis players
21st-century Belarusian people